Thomas John Nekrews (20 March 1933 - 30 October 2019) was an English former professional footballer who played as a centre-half. After an unsuccessful spell with Chelsea he went on to play professionally for Gillingham between 1953 and 1958, and in total made 42 appearances in the Football League. He joined Watford in July 1958, but made no League appearances.

References

1933 births
2019 deaths
Sportspeople from Chatham, Kent
Footballers from Kent
English footballers
Association football central defenders
Chelsea F.C. players
Gillingham F.C. players

Watford F.C. players
English Football League players